THN may refer to:

 Tai Hing (North) stop, Hong Kong
 The Hockey News, magazine
 Tetrahydronaphthalene, chemical
 Terre Haute North Vigo High School, school
 Trollhättan–Vänersborg Airport, Sweden